The Watzespitze or Waze (3,533m) is the highest mountain in the Kaunergrat group of the Ötztal Alps. It is located in Tyrol, Austria. The mountain has two summits, the main summit and the south summit at 3,503m. It is located between the valleys of Kaunertal in the east and Pitztal in the west. The mountain is a challenging climb due to its hanging glaciers and steep ridges.

References

Mountains of Tyrol (state)
Mountains of the Alps
Alpine three-thousanders
Ötztal Alps